Take Me Back is the sixth album release for Jesus music/gospel music performers Andraé Crouch and the Disciples. The album was digitally remastered and re-released in 2003.

Accolades

Track listing
All songs written by Andraé Crouch.

Side one
 "I'll Still Love You"
 "Praises"
 "Just Like He Said He Would"
 "All I Can Say (I Really Love You)"
 "You Can Depend On Me"

Side two
 "Take Me Back"
 "The Sweet Love of Jesus"
 "It Ain't No New Thing"
 "They Shall Be Mine"
 "Oh Savior"
 "Tell Them"

Personnel
Credits adapted from Tidal:

Album
 Andraé Crouch - production, arrangements, keyboards, organ, percussion, lead vocals, synthesizer
 Bill Maxwell - production, drums, percussion
 Clark Gassman - arrangements
 Larry Muhoberac - arrangements, brass, keyboards, synthesizer
 Conni Treantafeles - art direction, design
 Valerie Behling - art direction, design
 David Hungate - bass
 Wilton Felder - bass
 David T. Walker - guitar
 Dean Parks - guitar
 Fred Tackett - guitar
 Larry Carlton - guitar
 Ernie Watts - horn, saxophone
 Joe Sample - keyboards 
 Tom Hensley - keyboards
 Michelle Duffie - marketing consultant
 Billy Preston - organ
 Bill Thedford - percussion, vocals
 Burleigh Drummond - percussion
 Gary Denton - percussion
 Sandra Crouch - percussion, tambourine, vocals
 Bill Grine - photography
 Fred Jackson Jr. - saxophone
 Charles Loper - trombone
 George Bohanon - trombone
 Chuck Findley - trumpet
 Dalton Smith - trumpet
 Fletch Wiley - trumpet, vocals
 Mark Underwood - trumpet
 Dannibelle Hall - vocals

Digital remaster
 Claudius Craig - Compilation Coordinator
 Glenn Meadows - Digital Remastering
 Billy Taylor - Engineering, Mixing
 Chuck Johnson - Engineering
 Tom Trefethen - Engineering, Mixdown Engineering
 Joel Kerr - Mastering
 Michael Granger - Programming

Charts
Singles - Billboard

References

1975 albums
Andraé Crouch albums